Artem Olegovich Surkov (born 15 October 1993) is a Russian Greco-Roman wrestler. Senior World Champion 2018 and runner-up in 2019. He is bronze medalist Golden Grand Prix Ivan Poddubny in the Greco-Roman men's 66 kg event. He competed at the European Games 2015 and in the final match he defeated Migran Arutyunyan of Armenia. Also he won silver medal in World Greco-Roman Cup in Tehran, Islamic Republic of Iran. He was a member of the Russian team in 66 kg at the 2015 World Wrestling Championships in Las Vegas, United States, where he beat Migran Arutyunyan in the bronze medal match.

At the European Wrestling Championships 2018, he won a gold medal. He became world champion at 2018 World Wrestling Championships.

He competed at the 2020 Summer Olympics in Tokyo, Japan and he lost his bronze medal match against Mohamed Ibrahim El-Sayed of Egypt in the 67 kg event.

He is married and has a son.

References

External links 
 

1993 births
Living people
Russian male sport wrestlers
People from Saransk
European Games gold medalists for Russia
European Games medalists in wrestling
Wrestlers at the 2015 European Games
World Wrestling Championships medalists
European Wrestling Championships medalists
Wrestlers at the 2020 Summer Olympics
Sportspeople from Mordovia
Olympic wrestlers of Russia
21st-century Russian people